Harold "Scrappy" Lambert (May 12, 1901 – November 30, 1987, in New Brunswick, New Jersey) was an American dance band vocalist who appeared on hundreds of recordings from the 1920s to the 1940s.

At Rutgers University he was a cheerleader and played piano for a jazz group, the Rutgers Jazz Bandits. In February 1925, he and fellow student Billy Hillpot formed a musical duo impersonating the Smith Brothers. They were discovered in 1926 by Ben Bernie, who signed them to perform with his orchestra. Lambert and Hillpot appeared on many recordings with the orchestra and remained under Bernie's employ until 1928.

Other bandleaders who employed Lambert include Red Nichols, Frank Britton Wenzel, Fred Rich and Sam Lanin. Lambert was one of the Smith Brothers and also one of Red Nichols' Five Pennies.

In the 1920s and early 1930s, Lambert was one of the most prolific 'band vocalists' (hired to sing the vocal chorus on recordings by both performing Orchestras and studio groups).  His voice is featured on hundreds of recordings, as well as having a series of vocal solo recordings for Brunswick.

In the 1930s, Lambert and Hillpot took their comedy routine to the National Broadcasting Company. In 1943, MCA offered Lambert a job overseeing their radio department in Beverly Hills, California. This marked the end of his singing career, and he worked for MCA until 1948. He was living in Palm Springs at the time of his death. He died in Riverside, California.

"Cheerio, Cherry Lips, Cheerio," a 1929 vocal that Lambert recorded under the name Gordon Wallace, has been the closing theme of Dr. Demento's weekly radio broadcast since the early 1970s.

External links
 Scrappy Lambert recordings at the Discography of American Historical Recordings.

References

1901 births
1987 deaths
American jazz singers
Rutgers University alumni
20th-century American singers
The Charleston Chasers members